Derek Gamblin was an English amateur footballer, who played as a full back.

Career
Gamblin played non-league football for Sutton United, Leatherhead, Winchester City, and Wycombe Wanderers; he also made one appearance in the Football League for Portsmouth during the 1965–66 season.

He was also a member of the British national side which failed to qualify for the 1972 Summer Olympics.

References

1940s births
Living people
English footballers
Sutton United F.C. players
Portsmouth F.C. players
Leatherhead F.C. players
English Football League players
Winchester City F.C. players
Wycombe Wanderers F.C. players
Association football fullbacks